Nenad Mitrović (born 31 May 1998) is a Serbian footballer who plays as a goalkeeper.

Club career

OFK Bačka
Born in Novi Sad, Mitrović started his career with OFK Bačka. As a member of team academy, he has joined the first team during the 2013–14 Serbian League Vojvodina season at the age of 16 as an option for a goalkeeper. For the next season, he was also used as an option, but behind experienced Damir Drinić, Goran Labus, Nemanja Latinović and Vladimir Vujasinović. Mitrović made his senior debut in 29 fixture match of the 2014–15 Serbian First League season, against Kolubara, played on 16 May 2015. During the 2015–16 season, Mitrović was used as a back-up option several times, but however he did not get any chances to perform in the Serbian First League in front of more experienced Damir Drinić, Obren Čučković, Vladimir Vujasinović and Miloš Stepandić, Mitrović was also loaned to the Novi Sad-Syrmia Zone club Budućnost Gložan. After club made promotion in the Serbian SuperLiga, Mitrović started 2016–17 as a third choice goalkeeper. In the winter break off-season, Mitrović moved on a six-month loan to the Serbian League Belgrade side Žarkovo. In summer 2017, Mitrović joined Radnički Šid at one-year loan deal.

Career statistics

References

External links
 
 

1998 births
Footballers from Novi Sad
Living people
Serbian footballers
Association football goalkeepers
OFK Bačka players
OFK Žarkovo players
FK Radnički Šid players
FK ČSK Čelarevo players
MŠK Fomat Martin players
Serbian First League players
3. Liga (Slovakia) players
Serbian expatriate footballers
Expatriate footballers in Slovakia
Serbian expatriate sportspeople in Slovakia